Parisot is a commune in the Tarn-et-Garonne department in the Occitanie region in southern France.

It is twinned with Great Hucklow - a rural village of similar size in the Derbyshire Peak District, England.

See also
Communes of the Tarn-et-Garonne department

References

Communes of Tarn-et-Garonne